|}

The Prestbury Juvenile Novices' Hurdle is a Grade 2 National Hunt hurdle race in Great Britain which is open to three-year-old horses. It is run on the Old Course at Cheltenham over a distance of about 2 miles and half a furlong (2 miles and 87 yards, or 3,298 metres), and during its running there are eight hurdles to be jumped. The race is for novice hurdlers, and it is scheduled to take place each year in November.

The event was given Grade 2 status in 2004. It is currently sponsored by JCB and is run under the name of the JCB Triumph Trial Juvenile Hurdle.

Winners since 1987

See also
 Horse racing in Great Britain
 List of British National Hunt races

References
 Racing Post:
 pedigreequery.com – Prestbury Juvenile Novices' Hurdle – Cheltenham.

National Hunt races in Great Britain
Cheltenham Racecourse
National Hunt hurdle races